Leptophlebia cupida, known generally as the early brown spinner or black quill, is a species of pronggilled mayfly in the family Leptophlebiidae. It is found in North America.

References

Leptophlebiidae
Insects of North America
Taxa named by Thomas Say
Insects described in 1823
Articles created by Qbugbot